Carl Albrecht (28 March 1902 – 19 July 1965) was a German psychologist, psychotherapist and physician, who developed a new method of meditation based on autogenic training, and who was known for his psychological research on mystical consciousness.

Life
Albrecht belonged to a family of wealthy cotton merchants; his father was the cotton merchant Carl Albrecht (1875–1952) and his mother was the American-born Mary Ladson Robertson (1883–1960), who belonged to a prominent planter family from South Carolina. His father was a grandson of Baron Ludwig Knoop, one of the leading industrialists of the Russian Empire in his lifetime.

He was the father of the conductor George Alexander Albrecht and of the politician Ernst Albrecht, and the paternal grandfather of the President of the European Commission Ursula von der Leyen (née Albrecht) and the conductor Marc Albrecht.

Work
Albrecht was a physician and psychotherapist, and is known for developing a new method of meditation based on autogenic training. His psychological research on mystical consciousness culminated in his 1951 book Psychologie des Mystischen Bewußtseins; new editions were published in German in 1976, 1990 and 2018, and an annotated English edition titled Psychology of Mystical Consciousness was published in 2019 with an introduction by Franz K. Woehrer. Woehrer notes that "Albrecht's results are unique in that they derive from a pioneering methodological approach based on 'Autogenic Training', which enabled a practitioner to verbalize spontaneously what he/she is experiencing while immersed in an altered state of consciousness."

His work is cited as an influence on Gabriel Marcel and Karl Rahner.

Bibliography 
 Psychologie des mystischen Bewußtseins. Bremen 1951
 Published in English as Psychology of Mystical Consciousness, Crossroad Publishing Company, 2019
 Das mystische Erkennen. Gnoseologie und philosophische Relevanz der mystischen Relation. Bremen 1958.
 Carl Albrecht: Das mystische Wort. Erleben und Sprechen in Versunkenheit. Edited by Hans A. Fischer-Barnicol, with an introduction by Karl Rahner. Mainz 1974.

Ancestry

References

20th-century German physicians
German psychologists
Psychotherapists
1902 births
1965 deaths
20th-century psychologists
Albrecht family